"Boy Blue" is a song written by Jeff Lynne and performed by the Electric Light Orchestra (ELO) which first appeared as track number 3 from their 1974 album Eldorado.

Content

Composition

The album version of the song starts with a Baroque-style brass fanfare – reminiscent of Jeremiah Clarke's "Prince of Denmark's March" (ca. 1700) — and then develops into a minimoog sequence before the song properly begins. The song includes a midway solo of the band's three string players. At the end of the song the string instruments quickly fade, immediately leading into the LP's fourth track "Laredo Tornado".

Bassist Mike de Albuquerque sings on the song - one of his final appearances in the ELO catalogue.

The US edited single version of the song is missing the fanfare intro, parts of the orchestral bridge, and the second to last chorus.

Lyrics

The song is an anti-war song set during the Crusades and forms the second dream as part of the overall Eldorado dreamscape. It tells the story of Boy Blue, a war hero returning from a far-off war and the rapturous welcome he receives from his town folk. Boy Blue rebuffs the hero worship and declares his hatred of war, stating his refusal to ever “take up arms again”.

Reception
The song was released as the second single from the Eldorado album but failed to chart. Billboard said that it had a catchy hook and a similar "smooth sound"  to ELO's previous single "Can't Get It Out of My Head," and had expected it to achieve similar chart success.  Cash Box said "a big symphonic sound surrounds and cushions a driving rock beat on this excellently produced Jeff Lynne track." Record World said that the song "is just familiar enough on the first listen. This azure lad brings on visions of 'Hang On Sloopy,' then heads out on its own."

The song was covered by Rick Altizer on the tribute album Lynne Me Your Ears in a harder rock style.

References

Bibliography

1975 singles
Electric Light Orchestra songs
Song recordings produced by Jeff Lynne
Anti-war songs
Songs written by Jeff Lynne
1974 songs
United Artists Records singles